Heartwood is wood nearer the pith of a stem or branch, different in colour from sapwood.

Heartwood may also refer to:

 Heartwood Forest, which, when complete, will be the largest new native forest in England
 Heartwood House, a Canadian charity
 Heartwood – The Southwest Virginia Artisan Gateway, a building in Virginia, United States
 Heartwood (film), a 1998 American film starring Jason Robards